The Carlow county football team represents Carlow in men's Gaelic football and is governed by Carlow GAA, the county board of the Gaelic Athletic Association. The team competes in the three major annual inter-county competitions; the All-Ireland Senior Football Championship, the Leinster Senior Football Championship and the National Football League.

Carlow's home ground is Dr Cullen Park, Carlow. The team's manager is Niall Carew.

The team last won the Leinster Senior Championship in 1944, but has never won the All-Ireland Senior Championship or the National League.

History
Carlow have claimed very few honours at senior level. The team won a Leinster Senior Football Championship (SFC) in 1944. The final was played in Athy due to the war and Carlow defeated Dublin by a scoreline of 2–6 to 1–6. Carlow also lost Leinster SFC finals in 1941 and 1942 to the same opposition. Kerry fisherman-publican Paddy Bawn Brosnan kept Carlow from reaching an All-Ireland SFC final in 1944. His second-half goal put Carlow out of the All-Ireland semi-final by a scoreline of 3–3 to 0–10.

Ten years later Carlow reached the National League final with a famous 1–10 to 1–7 win against Armagh, but were well beaten by Mayo in the final.

Carlow won the 1994 All-Ireland B Senior Football Championship, and an O'Byrne Cup in 2002. The team defeated Wicklow by a scoreline of 2–10 to 0–8.

Other significant performances include reaching the Leinster Minor Football Championship final in 2007, when the team lost to Laois. The Carlow Vocational Schools team won the VEC All Ireland Championship in 1973, while Carlow CBS won an All-Ireland B title at Croke Park in 2015. An under-21 team came within a point of defeating Dublin in 1984.

In the 1980–81 National League Carlow once fielded a one-club selection so that Éire Óg could prepare for their first Leinster Club final. Tommy Dwyer, at 6'7, was one of the tallest midfielders in GAA history.

Paul Bealin spent a year as manager.

In late 2012, Anthony Rainbow was appointed manager of the senior county football team.

Carlow played Laois in a first round qualifier in 2013 — the first Friday night game in the history of the All-Ireland Senior Football Championship.

Turlough O'Brien managed Carlow between 2014 and 2020. In the 2018 National Football League, O'Brien led the team out of Division 4. This was their first promotion in more than three decades. In the 2018 Leinster Senior Football Championship, he led Carlow to a quarter-final victory against Kildare at O'Connor Park. He resigned in June 2020.

Also in 2018, Paul Broderick was nominated for an All Star, the first Carlow player to receive a nomination since Colm Hayden in 1994, which was the year Carlow won the All-Ireland Senior B Football Championship.

In August 2020, Niall Carew replaced O'Brien as manager.

Current panel

INJ Player has had an injury which has affected recent involvement with the county team.
RET Player has since retired from the county team.
WD Player has since withdrawn from the county team due to a non-injury issue.

Current management team
Manager: Niall Carew
Head coach: Ger Brennan
Selectors: Darren Leonard, Simon Rea
Performance coach: Eamonn Callaghan, since August 2022

Managerial history
Carlow have a history of appointing "foreign" managers, including Liam Hayes (Meath), Pat Roe (Laois), Paul Bealin (Dublin), Andy Shortall (Laois) and Bobby Millar (Laois).

Luke Dempsey: 2004, on an interim basis

Luke Dempsey (2) 2009/2010/2011/2012

Players

Notable players

Records
 Paddy Quirke (Naomh Eoin, Myshall) – dual All Star (hurling and football), Railway Cup Hurling and Football
 Tommy Dwyer (Tinryland) – International Rules Football, Railway Cup Football
 Luke Kelly (Leighlinbridge) – Leinster SFC winner 1944
 Jim Morris (Ballon) – Leinster SFC winner 1944
 Jimma Rea (O'Hanrahan's) – Leinster SFC winner 1944
 Simon Rea (Éire Óg) – Railway Cup SF
 Mark Carpenter (O'Hanrahan's) – Railway Cup SF, Leinster Club SF 2000
 Tom "Drakes" Walker (O'Hanrahan's) – Railway Cup SF
 Colm Hayden (Éire Óg) – Railway Cup SF, 5 Leinsters in 1990s with Éire Óg
 Johnny Nevin (Old Leighlin GFC/Naomh Brid HC) - Railway Cup SF, SH, All-Ireland Senior B Football Championship 1994, Carlow Championship 1997, All-Ireland over-40s runner-up 2008
 Andy Murphy (Tinryland) – Railway Cup SF
 "Paks" Connolly (Clonmore) – Railway Cup SF
 Martin Molloy (Clonmore /Rathvilly) – Railway Cup SF
 Luke Dempsey (Ballinabranna) – manager of Westmeath, Longford and Carlow
 Thomas Walshe (Fenagh GFC/Ballinkillen HC) – Railway Cup SF
 Cyril Hughes (St Andrew's, Bagenalstown GFC/Ballinkillen HC) – Railway Cup SF, manager of Carlow and Wexford
 Brendan Murphy (Rathvilly) – Leinster MFC runner-up 2007, professional Australian rules player
 Tommy 'The Boy Wonder' Murphy (Graiguecullen) – Team of the Millennium as Laois player, originally Carlow before the Graiguecullen expulsion
 Brendan Hayden Snr (Tinryland GFC/St Fintan's HC) – Railway Cup SF
 Vincent Harvey (Éire Óg) – former Carlow manager
 Ned Doogue (O'Hanrahan's) – Railway Cup SF
 Eamonn Long (O'Hanrahan's) – Railway Cup SF
 Cran Hogan (Éire Óg) – Railway Cup SF
 Willie Quinlan (Éire Óg) – Railway Cup SF, All-Ireland Senior B Football Championship 1994
 Andrew Corden (O'Hanrahan's) – O'Byrne Cup 2001
 Peeney Whelan (Tinryland) – Railway Cup SF
 Garvan Ware (Éire Óg) – Railway Cup SF, 5 Leinsters in 1990s with Éire Óg
 Joe Hayden (Éire Óg GFC/Carlow Town HC) – Railway Cup SF, 5 Leinsters in 1990s with Éire Óg
 Richie Moore (Éire Óg GFC/Carlow Town HC) – All-Ireland Senior B Football Championship 1994
 Willie Doyle (O'Hanrahan's) – International Rules 1985
 Hugh Brennan (Éire Óg) – Mayo minor, 5 Leinsters in 1990s with Éire Óg, All-Ireland Senior B Football Championship captain 1994
 Ned Gladney (St Mullins) – All-Ireland and Leinster 1961, 1962, eight county titles, and Full Forward on Team of the Century. The first man to captain Carlow at senior level.

All Stars
Carlow has no All Stars.

Honours

National
All-Ireland Senior B Football Championship
 Winners (1): 1994
National Football League
 Runners-up (1): 1953–54
National Football League Division 2
 Winners (1): 1934–35
All-Ireland Vocational Schools Championship
 Winners (1): 1973

Provincial
Leinster Senior Football Championship
 Winners (1): 1944
 Runners-up (2): 1941, 1942
O'Byrne Cup
 Winners (1): 2002
Leinster Junior Football Championship
 Winners (3): 1913, 1923, 1933
Leinster Under-21 Football Championship
 Runners-up (1): 1984
Leinster Minor Football Championship
 Runners-up (1): 2007

References

 
County football teams